Clyde Lucas (11 August 1898 – 12 January 1988) was an Australian cricketer. He played one first-class match for Tasmania in 1923/24.

See also
 List of Tasmanian representative cricketers

References

External links
 

1898 births
1988 deaths
Australian cricketers
Tasmania cricketers
Cricketers from Tasmania